Kathleen Knott (born 19 September 1987) is an Australian netball player in the ANZ Championship, playing for the Melbourne Vixens. Knott previously played with the Melbourne Kestrels (2007) in the Commonwealth Bank Trophy. Knott was a part of the 2009 Vixens premiership side. She was also a part of the tragic Black Saturday bushfires. She lost so much in the fires, but gained so much in 2009, as a backup shooter to Caitlin Thwaites. She is also a part of the Victorian Fury side, playing in the Australian Netball League.

References
 2009 Melbourne Vixens profile. Retrieved on 2009-04-25.

1987 births
Living people
Australian netball players
Melbourne Vixens players
ANZ Championship players
Victorian Netball League players
Australian Netball League players
Victorian Fury players
Netball players from Victoria (Australia)
Australian Institute of Sport netball players
Melbourne Kestrels players